Federico Díez de Medina (1839–1904) was born in La Paz, Bolivia. Bolivian Minister of Foreign Relations and Worship (1898, 1900–1901) and Dean of the Universidad Mayor de La Paz (1878). Politician and writer, he served as Bolivian ambassador throughout South America. He wrote several texts on international law, politics, and international relations.

References
 https://web.archive.org/web/20050411141512/http://www.rree.gov.bo/MINISTERIO/autoridades/fddm-curr.htm
 https://web.archive.org/web/20050408214001/http://bvumsa.umsanet.edu.bo/historia/umsa.htm

External links

 

1839 births
1904 deaths
People from La Paz
Foreign ministers of Bolivia
Ambassadors of Bolivia